Carmenta tildeni is a moth of the family Sesiidae. It was described by Thomas D. Eichlin in 1995, and is known from the United States, where it is found in Arizona and southern Texas, and from Mexico.

The wingspan is 8–10 mm for females.

Specimens were collected in the Brownsville, Texas, area at the end of October, and in Mexican localities on different dates from May to October.

Etymology
This species is named for the late J. W. "Bill" Tilden, noted teacher, entomologist/lepidopterist. He captured the portion of the type series of C. tildeni from Brownsville, Texas (including the holotype and allotype).

References

External links
mothphotographersgroup

Sesiidae
Moths described in 1995